Elpis Skoutari F.C. is a Greek football club, based in Skoutari, Serres, Greece.

Honors

Domestic Titles and honors

 Serres FCA Cup Winners: 1
 2016-17
 Greek Football Amateur Cup
Runners-Up (1): 2016–17

References

Football clubs in Central Macedonia
Serres
Association football clubs established in 1958
1958 establishments in Greece
Gamma Ethniki clubs